Annaphila arvalis is a species of moth in the family Noctuidae (owlet moths). It was described by Henry Edwards in 1875 and is found in North America, where it has been recorded from foothill canyons and riparian habitats in south-eastern British Columbia, eastern Washington, north-central Oregon, south to southern California.

The wingspan is about 20 mm. The forewings are grey, and the hindwings are light orange-yellow, with a thin black marginal band. Adults are on wing from early March to mid-April.

The larvae feed on Montia perfoliata.

The MONA or Hodges number for Annaphila arvalis is 9854.

References

Further reading
 Arnett, Ross H. (2000). American Insects: A Handbook of the Insects of America North of Mexico. CRC Press.
 Lafontaine, J. Donald & Schmidt, B. Christian (2010). "Annotated check list of the Noctuoidea (Insecta, Lepidoptera) of North America north of Mexico". ZooKeys, vol. 40, 1-239.

External links
Butterflies and Moths of North America

Noctuidae
Moths of North America
Moths described in 1875